Richard Fitz Turold (died after 1103–06) (alias fitzThorold, fitzTurolf) was an eleventh-century Anglo-Norman landowner in Cornwall and Devon, mentioned in the Domesday Book. In the 13th century his estates formed part of the Feudal barony of Cardinham, Cornwall, and in 1166 as recorded in the Cartae Baronum his estates had been held as a separate fiefdom from Reginald, Earl of Cornwall.

Origins
As the prefix fitz in his surname suggests he was presumably the son of Turold/Thorold/Turolf. A certain "Turulf", presumably his father, witnessed a charter to the monastery of Mont Saint-Michel in Normandy, to which same monastery Richard also granted lands.

Landholdings

Cornwall

Tenant of Count of Mortain
He had a castle at Cardinham in Cornwall, in which county he was a major tenant  and steward of Robert of Mortain, Count of Mortain, half-brother of King William the Conqueror. His holdings in Cornwall included the manor of Penhallam.

Devon

Tenant-in-chief
His entry in the Devonshire section of the Domesday Book lists Ricardus filius Turoldus as a tenant-in-chief of the king and holding four properties:
Woodhuish, Brixham parish, Haytor hundred 
Natsworthy, Widecombe-in-the-Moor parish, Haytor hundred 
East Allington, in Stanborough hundred 
One house in the City of Exeter

Mesne tenant
St Marychurch in the parish of Haytor hundred, held from the Count of Mortain.
Martin in Drewsteignton parish, Wonford hundred, held from Baldwin de Moeles, Sheriff of Devon

Progeny
His son was  William Fitz Richard of Cardinham, mentioned in deeds in 1110 and 1130, date of death unknown. It has been suggested that William's daughter and heiress became the wife of Reginald, Earl of Cornwall.

References
 Ian N. Soulsby, Richard Fitz Turold, Lord of Penhallam, Cornwall, Medieval Archaeology vol. 20 (1976)  pp. 146–8, online PDF

Notes

Anglo-Normans
Medieval Cornish people
Devon Domesday Book tenants-in-chief
11th-century Normans
12th-century deaths
Year of birth unknown
Year of death unknown